Yesterday's Shadow is a 2001 novel from Australian author Jon Cleary, his 50th over all. It was the eighteenth book featuring Sydney detective Scobie Malone.

The plot involves two murders which take place at the same hotel on the same night, one of the victims being the wife of the American ambassador. Although the book was generally well received critically, Cleary only wrote two more Malone novels.

References

External links
Yesterday's Shadow at AustLit (subscription required)

2001 Australian novels
Novels set in Sydney
Novels set in hotels
HarperCollins books
Novels by Jon Cleary